Qiyaməddinli (also, Kiyəməddinli, Kiamadani, Kiyamadinli, and Kiyamandynly) is a village and municipality in the Aghjabadi Rayon of Azerbaijan.

References 

Populated places in Aghjabadi District